The Best of Della Reese is the name of two albums:

The Best of Della Reese (1962 album)
The Best of Della Reese (1972 album)